KLRH is a non-commercial radio station located in Reno, Nevada, broadcasting on 92.9 FM.  KLRH airs a contemporary Christian music format branded as "K-Love" under the ownership of Educational Media Foundation (EMF).

 
The station signed on in November 1994 as KZSR. Until August 2014, the station was KURK, a commercial classic rock station owned by Wilks Broadcasting. On May 9, 2014, Wilks that it was selling the station to EMF, which already owned K-Love station KLRH (88.3 FM); the acquisition allowed EMF to bring its Air1 network to Reno. EMF took control of the station on August 1, 2014 and changed the call letters to KYSA; Wilks moved the classic rock format and the KURK call sign to 100.9 FM. On August 13, 2014, KYSA and KLRH swapped call signs. , KLRH was listed as a K-Love station, with KYSA carrying Air1.

Translators
KLRH also broadcasts on the following translators:

References

External links

LRH
Radio stations established in 1991
1991 establishments in Nevada
Educational Media Foundation radio stations
K-Love radio stations
LRH